The year 2018 was the 47th year after the independence of Bangladesh. It was also the fifth year of the third term of the Government of Sheikh Hasina.

Incumbents

 President: Abdul Hamid
 Prime Minister: Sheikh Hasina
 Chief Justice: Syed Mahmud Hossain
 Speaker of Jatiya Sangsad: Shirin Sharmin Chaudhury

Demography

Economy

Note: For the year 2018 average official exchange rate for BDT was 83.47 per US$.

Events
10 January - Tablighi Jamaat holds a mass blockade protesting against and preventing the entry of Indian Scholar Maulana Saad Kandhalvi to the holy Islamic gathering for the Bishwa Ijtema, who is forced to return home in face of the protests.
8 February - Ex Prime Minister and BNP Chairperson Khaleda Zia as per court verdict is jailed for 5 years in the Zia Charitable Trust corruption case. She is imprisoned in old Dhaka Central Jail located in Nazimuddin Road.
11 April - The Prime Minister announced the abolition of Quota system in Government recruitment in response to Bangladesh Quota Reform Protests 2018.
5 May - Unidentified gunmen ambushed and assassinated 5 people in Rangamati district, including UPDF leader Tapan Jyoti Chakma. It is suspected the attack was caused by internal conflicts between rival Chackma factions. This is the deadliest such incident involving the indigenous tribal Chackma people since the signing of the Chittagong Hill Tracts Peace Accord in 1997.
26 May- Kazi Nazrul Islam University of West Bengal awarded PM Sheikh Hasina with Doctorate of Literature. 
23 June - 52 people are killed in road accident in a single day as people were returning from Eid Vacation. This is the country's highest reported number of casualties from a road crash in a single day in recent times.
29 July - 8 August - On 29 July two college students are killed and nine others injured when a reckless driving Bus hit them in the capital Dhaka. Students all over the city carried out mass protests demanding punishment of the culprits and to put an end to reckless driving in the country.
22 September - In a massive rally, the newly formed coalition Jatiya Oikya Front, a platform led by Dr Kamal Hossain, issued an ultimatum from the rally for the three-point demand to be met by 30 September. The demands include: 1. Formation of a polls-time neutral government, 2. effective steps for reconstituting the Election Commission, 3. dissolution of parliament before the announcement of the election schedule. Several top leaders of the main opposition party BNP showed their support and shared the stage with Dr Kamal Hossain and his alliance at a citizens' rally in the capital and vowed joint movement to accomplish the three-point demands.
10 October  - Court verdict against the 2004 grenade attack is given. Top BNP leaders Lutfuzzaman Babar was given the death penalty and Tariqe Rahman was given life term imprisonment. BNP rejected the verdict and carried out protests against it.
30 December - The 2018 Bangladeshi general election were held, with a decisive victory for ruling party Bangladesh Awami League.

Awards and Recognitions
 Ahmed Zawad Chowdhury won the first Gold medal for Bangladesh in International Mathematical Olympiad.

Independence Day Award
Eighteen people were awarded.

Ekushey Padak
The award was given to 21 persons.
 AZM Takiullah (language movement)
 Mirza Mazharul Islam (language movement)
 Sheikh Sadi Khan (music)
 Shujeo Shyam (music)
 Indra Mohan Rajbongshi (music)
 Khurshid Alam (music)
 Motiul Haque Khan (music)
 Minu Haque (dance)
 Humayun Faridi (acting)
 Nikhil Sen (drama)
 Kalidas Karmakar (fine arts)
 Golam Mostofa (photography)
 Ranesh Maitra (journalism)
 Zulekha Haque (research)
 Muinul Islam (economics)
 Ilias Kanchan (social service) 
 Syed Manzoorul Islam (language and literature)
 Saiful Islam Khan (poet Hayat Saef) (language and literature)
 Subrata Barua (language and literature)
 Rabiul Hussain (language and literature)
 Khalekdad Chowdhury (language and literature)

Sports
18 March - Bangladesh lost to India in a closely contested T-20 Cricket Match in the Final of 2018 Nidahas Trophy.
6 August - Bangladesh won the 3 match T-20 Cricket series against the defending T-20 Cricket Champions, West indies, 2-1.
8 October - Bangladesh under 18 women's football team won the 2018 SAFF U-18 Women's Championship.
4 November - Bangladesh national under-15 football team won the 2018 SAFF U-15 Championship, defeating Pakistan national under-15 football team in the final.
16 November - Bangladesh ties the two match test cricket series against Zimbabwe, 1-1, after beating Zimbabwe in the 2nd and final test match by a historic 218 runs.

Deaths

5 January – Dhiraj Kumar Nath, diplomat (b. 1945).
16 January – Shammi Akhtar, singer
25 January – Shawkat Ali, writer (b. 1936)
5 March – Rafiqul Islam, physician (born c.1936).
6 March – Ferdousi Priyabhashini, sculptor (b. 1947)
21 March – Noorjahan Kakon Bibi, freedom fighter and secret agent (b. 1915)
21 April – Anwara Begum, 83, academic and former First Lady.
24 April – Belal Chowdhury, poet (b. 1938)
26 April – Shamsul Islam, politician (b. 1931).
9 May – Mustafa Nur-Ul Islam, academic, National Professor (b. 1927).
22 May – 
Tazin Ahmed, journalist, actress, playwright, director, and theater person (b 1975).
Hafiz Siddiqi, academic (b. 1931).
26 June – Ahsanullah Montu, footballer (b. 1962).
7 July – Rani Sarker, film actress (b. 1930s).
25 July – Kalparanjan Chakma, politician (b. 1918).
26 July – Mostafa Suja, politician (born c.1950).
18 October - Ayub Bachchu, leading musician (born 1962).
15 December- Amjad Hossain, film actor and director (born 1942).

See also
 2010s in Bangladesh
 List of Bangladeshi films of 2018
 Timeline of Bangladeshi history

References

 
2010s in Bangladesh
Years of the 21st century in Bangladesh
Bangladesh
Bangladesh